35 Engineer Support Regiment is a regiment of the South African Engineer Corps. The role of the unit is to be the depot of prime mission equipment for the engineer corps.

History

Origin
Originally established at Kroonstad as 35 Field Park Squadron but later renamed 35 Engineer Support Unit. 
The unit was moved to Mariedale near Springs and renamed 35 Engineer Support Regiment with the number 35 being replaced on its flash by the bee.

Leadership
 Col Gerrit Janse van Vuuren
 Lt Col Sam Mbonani

Insignia

Previous Insignia

References 

Engineer regiments of South Africa
Military units and formations in Brakpan